KOF: Maximum Impact (KOFMI) is a fighting game developed by SNK subsidiary Noise Factory and published by SNK Playmore for the PlayStation 2 in 2004. An enhanced version was released for both the Xbox and PlayStation 2 under the title KOF Maximum Impact: Maniax. The PS2 version of 'Maniax' was only released in Japan.

Marketed as a spin-off of SNK's major fighting series The King of Fighters, whence many of its characters originate, KOF: Maximum Impact also contains elements of the Fatal Fury and Art of Fighting series. KOF: Maximum Impact is the first 3D fighter made by SNK since 1990s era's Fatal Fury: Wild Ambition and lastly, Samurai Shodown: Warriors Rage for the PlayStation. The game was followed by KOF: Maximum Impact 2.

While the version released in the U.S. featured an English dub that was met with much derision (with IGN's Jeremy Dunham going so far as to label it "piss poor"), further releases for the Xbox and European PS2 add a choice of English and Japanese language options. The Xbox version also includes an online match mode where matches can be fought between players via Xbox Live.

Gameplay
Unlike the 2D games from the series, Maximum Impact breaks the team system, causing all the fighters to fight alone (as it depicted in Art of Fighting 2, Fatal Fury 2/Special and Garou: Mark of the Wolves). The story mode is experienced as a single character through the "Mephistopheles Fighting Tournament". For most characters, this consists of fighting six characters, with Duke's cronie / Consigliere Hyena announcing the next opponent between matches. For the final match, one faces Duke himself. For a few "featured" characters (Alba Meira, Soiree Meira, and Lien Neville), the story is more intricate and fleshed out.

The gameplay is similar to those of Tekken and Bloody Roar series, such as having a more combo command moves system and players being capable of executing juggle combos freely.

In Versus Mode, a single match (be it a one-on-one fight or a 3 vs. 3 battle) is fought against either the computer or another player. In Mission Mode, the player is faced with four levels of ten missions each. Each mission has settings and conditions to be completed. Most of the game's unlockables come through this mode. In Time Attack Mode, the player has to defeat a number of characters as quickly as possible. The online mode is available only on the Xbox version, and features online matchmaking for play between two players.

Plot
It is a spin off of the original line set 2 years after the events of N.E.S.T.S. saga, an alternate saga to the  Ash.

Addis was the most powerful gang in Southtown. Its leader, a man known only as Fate, was considered a modern-day Robin Hood to the poor and downtrodden. He himself had adopted two twin brothers, Alba and Soiree Meira, and trained them to be successors to his legacy. Six months before the in-game events, Fate is killed by Duke, the leader of the up-and-coming Mephistopheles gang. Duke then proceeds to exploit the poor to serve his thirst for power.

In the present day, the "Mephistopheles Fighting Tournament" is beginning, with the venue being all of Southtown. The participants (minus the Meira Brothers and Lien) believe that the tournament is being sponsored by a charity organization known as the Metatron Foundation, but they soon learn that its true sponsor is the Mephistopheles gang. Alba, Soiree and Lien are contacted directly by Hyena, so they know Metatron has nothing to do with this.

Characters
KOF: Maximum Impact has twenty playable characters. Six additional characters make their debut in this game, and most of the remaining roster is inherited from The King of Fighters series. One noteworthy exception to the rule is Rock Howard, brought in from the most recent Fatal Fury chapter, Garou: Mark of the Wolves.

Each character features at least one alternative costume. Some alternate costumes are radically different from the defaults, such as Terry's Garou: Mark of the Wolves look and Clark's professional wrestler persona. In addition to the alternate costumes, characters can be modified with unlockable "rigging models," which add details to the available costumes, such as a wolf mask for Terry or a party hat and banner for Seth.

New Characters

 Alba Meira – The star of KOF: Maximum Impact, Alba is a former soldier and prodigy of Fate, the former boss of the Southtown gangs, who enters the tournament so he can contact (and destroy) Duke to basically rule Southtown in Fate's stead.
 Soiree Meira – Alba's younger twin brother, who is more brash than his cool-headed older brother. He is determined to help Alba dispose of Duke by any means necessary.
 Duke – The leader of the Mephistopheles gang that controls Southtown. Earned the nickname "Hell's Executioner" because of the prominent scar across his neck. Duke is the final boss of the game.
 Lien Neville – An assassin who Duke hires to enter the KOF tournament and dispose of any insurgency.
 Mignon Beart – A young witch-in-training who enters the tournament to test her own might and help create world peace.
 Chae Lim – Star pupil of Fatal Fury and The King of Fighters character Kim Kaphwan, who enters the tournament in his place.

Old characters

From The King of Fighters:
 Kyo Kusanagi
 Iori Yagami
 Leona Heidern
 K′
 Maxima
 Seth

From Fatal Fury:
 Terry Bogard
 Mai Shiranui
 Rock Howard

From Art of Fighting:
 Ryo Sakazaki
 Yuri Sakazaki

From Ikari Warriors:
 Ralf Jones
 Clark Still

From Psycho Soldier:
 Athena Asamiya

Development
Several of the new characters from the game were designed to be the counterparts of other KOF characters. Both Meira brothers were initially conceptualized to be the counterparts to Fatal Fury stars, Terry and Andy Bogard, given the game's setting is the same as their predecessors. Lien conceptually began as a contrast to fellow KOF participant Mai Shiranui. While Mai represents a "sexy and beautiful kunoichi", Lien represents another counterpart: the "sexy Western femme fatale". Her outfits are purposely designed to be "tight and constricting" to contrast Mai's clothing, which is made to allow for easy and quick movements. To further the contrast between the two assassins, efforts were made to make Lien more serious and darker than Mai, despite being one of the heroines in the series.  Similar to how Lien contrasts Mai, Mignon was designed to be the rival to Athena. Her magical powers were created to counter Athena's Psycho Powers, which is interpreted by Falcoon to be akin to witchcraft.

Originally, Kim Kaphwan was going to enter the first entry of the Maximum Impact series under the pseudonym "Mr. Taekwondo" – in the same fashion as Art of Fighting'''s Mr. Karate. Due to veteran designers' complaints and other difficulties at the time, it was finally decided to leave Kim out of the game's lineup but add another character like him to replace his absence. While several other characters were considered for the spot – including other SNK characters such as Jhun Hoon, May Lee, and Buriki One character Seo Yong Song – a fellow developer voiced interest in creating another female Taekwondo fighter with the same "professional" manner as Kim, which eventually formed the basis for Chae Lim.

Reception

Prior to its release, KOF: Maximum Impact was a finalist from GameSpot's "Best of E3 2004" in the category Best Fighting Game. However, it lost to Mortal Kombat: Deception. Ben Herman, president from SNK Playmore USA, commented that although he received complaints about the English voices for the game, Maximum Impact'' sold over 100,000 units as of May 2006.

References

External links
KOF: Maximum Impact official Japanese website
KOF: Maximum Impact- Maniax official Japanese website

2004 video games
3D fighting games
The King of Fighters games
Fighting games
PlayStation 2 games
PlayStation Network games
Xbox games
SNK Playmore games
Video games developed in Japan
RenderWare games
Multiplayer and single-player video games